John Hassett was an Irish politician.

John Hassett may also refer to:

Buddy Hassett
John Blennerhassett (English MP), also known as John Hassett